Aepinus is a genus of crabs belonging to the family Inachoididae.

The species of this genus are found in Central America.

Species:

Aepinus septemspinosus

References

Majoidea
Decapod genera